Royal Air Force Haverfordwest or more simply RAF Haverfordwest is a former Royal Air Force station located  north of Haverfordwest, Pembrokeshire and  south of Fishguard, Pembrokeshire, Wales.

It was operational between 1943 and 1945 and was controlled by No.17 Group of RAF Coastal Command.

History

The following units were here posted here at some point:
 No. 3 (Coastal) Operational Training Unit RAF
 No. 4 Refresher Flying Unit RAF
 No. 7 (Coastal) Operational Training Unit RAF
 No. 8 (Coastal) Operational Training Unit RAF
 No. 20 Air Crew Holding Unit RAF
 No. 21 Air Crew Holding Unit RAF
 No. 516 Squadron RAF
 No. 2710 Squadron RAF Regiment
 No. 2776 Squadron RAF Regiment
 General Reconnaissance Aircraft Preparation Pool
 Navigators 'W' Holding Course
 Polish Flight

Current use

The site is currently used by Haverfordwest Aerodrome, a public-use general aviation airport.

See also
 List of former Royal Air Force stations

References

Royal Air Force stations in Wales